Epyaxa lucidata is a species of moth in the family Geometridae. It is endemic to New Zealand.

Taxonomy
This species was first described by Francis Walker in 1862 using material collected by Andrew Sinclair and named Larentia lucidata. The holotype specimen is held at the Natural History Museum, London.

Distribution
This species is endemic to New Zealand.

References

Xanthorhoini
Moths of New Zealand
Endemic fauna of New Zealand
Taxa named by Francis Walker (entomologist)
Moths described in 1862
Endemic moths of New Zealand